Marita compta is a species of sea snail, a marine gastropod mollusk in the family Mangeliidae.

Description
The length of the shell attains 12 mm.

The spire and the upper part of the body whorl are longitudinally plicate, crossed by fine close revolving lines. The outer lip is acute, unarmed, widely but not deeply sinuous behind. The color of the shell is light yellowish or whitish, maculated more or less with chestnut.

Distribution
This marine species is endemic to Australia and occurs off New South Wales, South Australia, Tasmania, Victoria and Western Australia

References

 Gould, A.A. 1860. Descriptions of new shells collected by the United States North Pacific Exploring Expedition. Proceedings of the Boston Society of Natural History 7: 323-340
 Adams, A. & Angas, G.F. 1864. Descriptions of new species from Australian seas, in the collection of George French Angas. Proceedings of the Zoological Society of London 1863(III): 418–428, pl. xxxvii
 Tenison-Woods, J.E. 1877. On some new Tasmanian marine shells. Papers and Proceedings of the Royal Society of Tasmania 1876: 131-159
 Verco, J.C. 1909. Notes on South Australian marine Mollusca with descriptions of new species. Part XII. Transactions of the Royal Society of South Australia 33: 293-342
 May, W.L. 1923. An Illustrated Index of Tasmanian Shells: with 47 plates and 1052 species. Hobart : Government Printer 100 pp.
 Laseron, C. 1954. Revision of the New South Wales Turridae (Mollusca). Australian Zoological Handbook. Sydney : Royal Zoological Society of New South Wales 1-56, pls 1-12.

External links
  Tucker, J.K. 2004 Catalog of recent and fossil turrids (Mollusca: Gastropoda). Zootaxa 682:1-1295.
  Hedley C. 1922. A revision of the Australian Turridae. Records of the Australian Museum 13(6): 213-359
 

compta
Gastropods described in 1864
Gastropods of Australia